Recharged (stylized in all caps) is the second remix album of recordings by American rock band Linkin Park. The album was released on October 29, 2013, through Warner Bros. Records and Machine Shop Recordings. It is entirely produced by Rick Rubin and Mike Shinoda. The album includes remixes of ten of the songs from the band's fifth studio album Living Things, as well as a new song, "A Light That Never Comes" (and a remix of it) with Steve Aoki, which is the album's first single, released on September 16. Recharged received mixed reviews from critics.

Background and promotion
Recharged was officially announced on the band's Facebook page on September 12, 2013, the same day that their new game, LP Recharge, was released. The band revealed that the album is a remix album, featuring reinterpretations of ten of the songs from Living Things, as well as including their new song with Steve Aoki, "A Light That Never Comes" (and a remix of it). Five of the remixes were previously released as part of a pre-order promotion for Living Things, called Living Things Remixed (following the release of Living Things, pre-order customers received a remix of a song from the album each month for eight months). The band also announced that there will be a limited-edition version of the album, available exclusively from their website. It features an interactive 3D sculpture based on the Living Things album artwork, a 48-page art booklet, both Living Things and Recharged albums, and a magnetic stylus that can interact with the liquid solution in the 3D sculpture to create unique patterns and designs are included. Pre-orders began on September 16.

In regards to the song "A Light That Never Comes" and the album, Mike Shinoda said:

On September 13, Shinoda made another post on the band's Facebook page, revealing the track list and talking about the album:

In that same post, Shinoda revealed that pre-orders from the band's website will receive an exclusive digital download of Paul van Dyk's remix of "Burn It Down", which was also previously released as part of Living Things Remixed.

As of October 24, 2013, the album can be heard in its entirety on MTV.com, five days before it was officially released.

On January 21, 2014, a new EP was released entitled, "A Light That Never Comes (Remixes)" online.

Critical reception

At Metacritic, which assigns a weighted average score out of 100 to reviews from mainstream critics, Recharged received an average score of 49 based on 4 reviews, indicating mixed or average reviews. NME called Recharged "further proof" that dubstep and EDM is nu metal's successor, and described the songs as "nosebleed drum’n’bass, 8-bit blips and oversized dancehall bass". They go on to add "Rick Rubin’s final Primal Scream-gone-hip-hop remix of "A Light That Never Comes" saves Recharged from disaster, but you might need resuscitating after this lot"

Stephen Thomas Erlewine of AllMusic gave it 3 out of 5 stars, declaring that "This is the kind of album that appeals primarily for hardcore fans looking for a new spin on the familiar; in other words, this is unlikely to convert EDM listeners to the pleasures of Linkin Park."

Commercial performance
The album debuted at number ten on the Billboard 200 chart, with first-week sales of 33,000 copies in the United States. In its second week, the album sold 11,000 more copies. In its third week, the album sold 5,000 more copies bringing its total album sales to 49,000. By mid-2014, the album is said to have reached 111,000 sales in US. The album did more business in 2014 as compared to 2013. It became the eighth best selling Dance/Electronic Album and twenty-fifth best selling Hard Rock Album.

Track listing

Notes
 All tracks are stylized in all caps, just like their original versions.

Personnel 
Original Living Things credits adapted from Living Things liner notes.

Linkin Park
 Chester Bennington – vocals
 Rob Bourdon  – drums
 Brad Delson – lead guitar, backing vocals; additional vocals on "Until It Breaks"; synthesizer on "Burn It Down"; sampler on "Lies Greed Misery", "Castle of Glass" and "Victimized"; acoustic guitar on "Castle of Glass"
 Dave "Phoenix" Farrell – bass, backing vocals; sampler on "Lost in the Echo", "Lies Greed Misery" and "Victimized"
 Joe Hahn – turntables, samples, programming, backing vocals
 Mike Shinoda – vocals, rhythm guitar, keyboard, piano, synthesizer; strings and horns on "Castle of Glass"

Additional musicians
 Steve Aoki – programmer, producer on "A Light That Never Comes"
 Owen Pallett – strings on "I'll Be Gone"
 KillSonik – interpretation on remix of "Lost in the Echo"
 Vice – interpretation on first remix of "I'll Be Gone"
 Pusha T – vocals on first remix of "I'll Be Gone"
 Dirtyphonics – interpretation on remix of "Lies Greed Misery"
 Rad Omen – interpretation on remix of "Roads Untraveled"
 Bun B – vocals on remix of "Roads Untraveled"
 Enferno – interpretation on remix of "Powerless"
 Tom Swoon – interpretation on remix of "Burn It Down"
 Datsik – interpretation on the first remix of "Until It Breaks"
 Nick Catchdubs – interpretation on the remix of "Skin to Bone"
 Cody B. Ware – vocals on remix of "Skin to Bone"
 Ryu – vocals on remix of "Skin to Bone"
 Schoolboy – interpretation on second remix of "I'll Be Gone"
 Money Mark – interpretation on second remix of "Until It Breaks"
 Rick Rubin – interpretation on remix of "A Light That Never Comes"

Additional personnel
 Rick Rubin – producer
 Mike Shinoda – producer, engineer, creative director
 Joe Hahn – creative director
 Ethan Mates – engineer
 Andrew Hayes – assistant, engineer, editor
 Brad Delson – additional production
 Jerry Johnson – drum technician
 Ryan DeMarti – production coordination, A&R coordination
 Manny Marroquin – mixing (assisted by Chris Galland and Del Bowers)
 Chris "Tek" O'Ryan - sound engineer
 Brian Gardner – mastering
 Rob Cavallo – A&R
 Liza Jospeph – A&R coordination
 Peter Standish – marketing director
 Mike Shinoda, Joe Hahn, Rickey Kim – creative direction
 Annie Nguyen – art direction
 Brandon Parvini of Ghost Town Media – additional artwork
 Frank Maddocks – LP icon design

Charts and certifications

Weekly charts

Year-end charts

Certifications

Release history

References

Linkin Park albums
2013 remix albums
Albums produced by Mike Shinoda
Albums produced by Rick Rubin
Warner Records remix albums